King of Alcatraz is a 1938 American drama film directed by Robert Florey and starring Gail Patrick, Lloyd Nolan and Harry Carey. It was the film debut of Robert Preston.

Plot
Just as gangster Steve Murkil is escaping from Alcatraz prison, rival San Francisco radio operators Ray Grayson and Bob MacArthur find themselves assigned to a freighter run by Captain Glennan, headed out to sea.

Among those on board are a new nurse, Dale Borden, and passengers including a young woman and her mother. The younger one is Murkil's moll and the mother is Murkil himself in disguise, making a getaway, with several of his cronies also aboard ship.

Ray and Bob both develop a romantic interest in Dale and both end up in confrontations with Murkil. A fight results in Ray being wounded, with Dale receiving radio instructions on how to perform an operation that he immediately needs. Murkil nearly makes his escape until he is shot by Glennan. On shore, Ray and Dale decide to get married, with Bob their best man.

Cast
 Gail Patrick as Dale Borden
 Lloyd Nolan as Raymond Grayson
 Harry Carey as Captain Glennan
 J. Carrol Naish as Steve Murkil
 Robert Preston as Robert MacArthur
 Anthony Quinn as Lou Gedney
 Dennis Morgan as First Mate Rogers (as Richard Stanley)
 Richard Denning as Harry Vay
 Konstantin Shayne as Murok
 Eddie Marr as Dave Carter
 Emory Parnell as Olaf
 Paul Fix as 'Nails' Miller
 Virginia Vale as Dixie (as Dorothy Howe)
 Monte Blue as Officer
 John Hart as 1st Radio Operator

Critical reaction 
New York Times critic Frank Nugent called the film "a trim little melodrama, tightly written and logically contrived." Kate Cameron of the New York Daily News gave the film three of four stars. She praised Florey's direction and Nolan's performance. An Orlando Sentinel reviewer called the film "a conglomeration of the old gangster films with a not quite conscientious triangle added."

See also
 Harry Carey filmography

References

External links

1938 films
1938 drama films
American drama films
1930s English-language films
American black-and-white films
Films directed by Robert Florey
Paramount Pictures films
Alcatraz Island in fiction
Films set on islands
Films set in San Francisco
Films about ship hijackings
1930s American films